Marvellous (British) or Marvelous (American) may refer to:

Film and TV
 Marvelous Entertainment, a Japanese media corporation
 Marvelous (film) a 2006 drama/comedy film starring Martha Plimpton
 Marvellous, a 2014 British drama television film with Toby Jones

Music
 Marvelous, a 1960 album by Marv Johnson
 Marvelous (album), a 2001 Japanese album by Misia
 Marvelous, a 2022 album by American rapper Yung Gravy
 "Marvellous", a song by the Lightning Seeds from the 1994 album Jollification
 "Marvellous!", a single by The Twelfth Man from the 1992 album Still the 12th Man

Video games
 Marvelous: Mōhitotsu no Takarajima, a video game by Nintendo
 Marvelous (company), a video game developer

Other
 Marvellous (horse), a racehorse

See also